David Dickson of Persilands or David Dickson the Elder (1754–1820) was a Church of Scotland minister  and father of David Dickson the Younger.

Life

He was born on 30 March 1754 the third son of Rev David Dickson of Kilbucho, minister of Newlands. He was educated at West Linton parish school, then in Peebles, He studied at Glasgow University and Edinburgh University. He was licensed to preach in sugust 1775 by the Presbytery of Biggar.

His first role was as assistant minister in Libberton in Lanarkshire, and in May 1777 he was ordained minister there in place of the previous minister. In July 1783 he translated to Bothkennar north of Falkirk. In October 1785 he moved to Canongate Chapel of Ease in Edinburgh, effectively an "overflow" church for Canongate Kirk required due the rapidly expanding population in the city. The main church at this time was under control of Rev Robert Walker. He moved briefly to the nearby Trinity College Church to the west in 1799 before settling in the New (West) Kirk in St Giles in November 1801: one of four parishes then contained in St Giles Cathedral, and one of the most important charges in Scotland.

In 1810 he was living at 28 York Place, Edinburgh.

He died at 13 Forth Street in Edinburgh on 2 August 1820. He is buried in a vault in the graveyard of St Cuthbert's Church, Edinburgh, where his son was minister.

Family
In 1777 he married Christina Wardrobe (1755-1832) daughter of Rev Thomas Wardrobe of Bathgate. Thir children included:

Margaret (1778-1852)
Rev David Dickson (1780-1842) minister of St Cuthbert's Church, Edinburgh
John Dickson WS (1781-1823) advocate at 19 Nicolson St in Edinburgh
William (b.1783)
Anne (1787-1860)
Elizabeth Somerville Dickson (1792-1843) married John Tawse advocate, Secretary of the Society for Propagating Christian Knowledge
James Wardrobe Dickson (1794-1847) advocate
Christian Wardrobe Dickson (1800-1802)

Publications
Account of Bothkennar

References
 

1754 births
1820 deaths
People from the Scottish Borders
Ministers of St Giles' Cathedral
18th-century Ministers of the Church of Scotland
19th-century Ministers of the Church of Scotland